Christopher Lynn Moore (born January 11, 1993), better known by his stage name Lil Twist, is an American rapper from Dallas, Texas. He is signed to Lil Wayne's Young Money Entertainment.

Career
Lil Twist is from Dallas, Texas. He dropped out of high school after completing one year.

When he was 12 years old, Lil Twist went to a Lil Wayne concert in Tyler, Texas and opened for Lil Wayne. Impressed, Cortez and Wayne flew Lil Twist to Atlanta to see how he was in a recording studio.

He released his first single, "The Texas Twist", when he was 10 years old, which was #1 locally in Dallas for 6 straight weeks.

He released mixtapes such as The Golden Child, and a single, "Love Affair" to build anticipation for his planned but never released album, Bad Decisions.

He was featured in XXL hip hop magazine's "2011 Freshman Class". Since then, he has been featured as a guest artist on recordings by Bieber in "Twerk", "Wind It" and others, 2 Chainz in "Do What I Want" and with Miley Cyrus. His 2012 mixtape 3 Weeks in Miami is a collaboration with Khalil.

Lil Twist has made guest appearances on Disney Channel's animated series Fish Hooks as the voice of Brandon Bubbler.

On April 11, 2017, Lil Twist dropped his mixtape, Young Carter.

Personal life
On July 11, 2013, Lil Twist was arrested for DUI in Calabasas, California. He was driving Justin Bieber's Fisker Karma and was alleged to be going between 60 and 70 mph in a 30 mph zone.

Lil Twist was arrested and charged with making criminal threats, burglary, grand theft, battery and 2 counts of assault with a deadly weapon in March 2015. This was after Twist and four others assaulted Disney actor Kyle Massey and Massey's brother, Christopher Massey.  On December 1, 2016, Lil Twist pleaded no contest to six charges and received a one-year sentence. He was released from prison in March 2017 after serving seven and one-half weeks of his sentence.

Discography

Compilation albums

Mixtapes

Singles
As lead artist

Other charted songs

A.  Charted only on the Bubbling Under Hot 100 Singles or Bubbling Under R&B/Hip-Hop Songs charts.
B.  "YM Salute" did not chart on the Hot Rap Songs chart but reached #41 on the Rap Digital Songs chart.

References

External links
 

African-American male rappers
Living people
1993 births
Place of birth missing (living people)
Cash Money Records artists
Young Money Entertainment artists
Rappers from Dallas
People from Oak Cliff, Texas
21st-century American rappers
21st-century American male musicians
21st-century African-American musicians